Costa Firenze is a  constructed at Fincantieri's shipyard in Marghera for Costa Cruises, a subsidiary of Carnival Corporation & plc, and sister ship to Costa Venezia. Costa Firenze is scheduled to be transferred to Carnival in 2024 under the new Costa by Carnival concept. It is to be renamed Carnival Firenze.

History

Planning and construction 
Carnival Corporation entered a strategic agreement with Fincantieri in March 2015 for five cruise ships for delivery between 2019 and 2022. On 30 December 2015, Carnival Corporation and Fincantieri signed a memorandum of agreement for four cruise ships, with two then-unnamed ships for Costa Asia among the four. This announcement coincided with Carnival Corporation's unveiling of its plans for the expansion of the Costa Asia fleet, which would consist of two vessels at  each, with a guest capacity of approximately 4,200 passengers per vessel. The contracts for the two newbuild vessels were finalized in April 2016. The two ships, comprising a new class of vessels in Costa's fleet, were designed to be sister ships and continue carrying Costa's Italian-style interior designs and features while hosting an Asian clientele.

On 6 May 2019, Costa Cruises announced that the second of the two vessels built specifically for the Chinese market would be named Costa Firenze, named after Florence, Italy, and have interior features inspired by Florentine history and culture. The ship was floated out from the shipyard on 6 November 2019.

Interiors

Delivery 
Costa Firenze was scheduled to be delivered on 30 September 2020 and postponed to a time later in 2020, but the delivery took place on 22 December 2020.

Operational career 
Carnival Corporation announced on 6 May 2019 that Costa Firenze would initially spend her first month sailing in the Mediterranean, calling in ports in Italy, Spain, and France. Her maiden voyage was scheduled for 1 October 2020, departing from Trieste and calling in Bari, Barcelona, and Marseille, before arriving in Savona. Then, she was to depart from Savona on 2 November to begin a 51-day cruise to Hong Kong, arriving on 22 December.

However, in late-August 2019, Costa Cruises announced changes to Costa Firenzes maiden deployments. These changes scrapped the maiden voyage and her month of Mediterranean sailings that were planned and the ship will, instead, head for Singapore immediately following her delivery and debut for Chinese customers on 20 October. But on 13 July 2020, it was reported that Costa will revert to deploying Costa Firenze to Europe, scheduling her to sail weekly itineraries in the Mediterranean after being delivered, and also operate all cancelled sailings of Costa Toscana through 2021 due to the ship's delayed delivery.

On 22 June, 2022, it was announced that Costa Firenze would sail under the Carnival brand in 2024, from Long Beach, California. With Carnival and Costa debuting a new concept, Costa by Carnival. The ship will be renamed Carnival Firenze and have a new Carnival Italian style livery. It will be staffed and operated by Carnival Cruise Line, and will enter dry dock before sailing from North America. Details on itineraries are being finalized and will be announced soon. 

Costa Firenzes sister ship Costa Venezia will also debut under the Carnival brand in 2023, and will sail from New York City, New York. In December 2022, Carnival announced that these two ships will be known as the Venice-class.

References 

Firenze
Ships built by Fincantieri
2019 ships